Sabri Ali (born 20 September 2000) is a Djiboutian footballer who plays as a forward for Djibouti Premier League club FC Dikhil and the Djibouti national team.

Club career 
As of March 2021, Ali plays for FC Dikhil of the Djibouti Premier League. For the 2021 season he was among the top goal scorers in the league.

International career 
Ali featured for the Djibout national under-20 team at the 2019 CECAFA U-20 Championship and the 2020 CECAFA U-20 Championship. In summer 2021 he was part of the Djibouti squad for the 2021 CECAFA U-23 Challenge Cup.

Ali made his senior international debut on 15 June 2021 in a friendly against Somalia. Later that month he was part of Djibouti's squad for a 2021 FIFA Arab Cup qualification match against Lebanon. He went on to appear in the 0–1 defeat as a second-half substitute.

International career statistics

References

External links 

2000 births
Living people
Djiboutian footballers
Association football forwards
Djibouti international footballers